The Maserati 8CL is an open-wheel Grand Prix motor racing car, designed, developed and built by Italian manufacturer Maserati, from 1940 through 1946. Only two models were produced.

Racing and competitive history
Featuring a longer wheelbase, it succeeded the 8CTF. She was conceived to participate in the International Formula. The technical setting that gave positive results with the 4CL was resumed, namely four valves per cylinder, a square engine (i.e. the piston stroke was equal to the cylinder bore), and two compressors, one for each bank of 4 cylinders.

The outbreak of World War II shortly after its launch interrupted its development. The resumption of competitive activities after the conflict relegated supercharged racing cars, and with a large displacement, to free formulas, which however did not interest the public. This was also the fate of 8CL.

Two specimens were built, one before and one after the Second World War: the first was sold in Argentina, while the second was made specifically for the Scuderia Milano and achieved good results with Gigi Villoresi (third classified at the Indianapolis 500 in 1946). and Nino Farina (winner of the Mar del Plata Grand Prix in 1948).

Design
The ignition was single with a Spark magnet. The distribution was with four valves per cylinder arranged in a 90° V, and a double overhead camshaft. Lubrication was forced with delivery and recovery pumps. The cooling system was water circulation with centrifugal pumps.

The engine was supercharged with two Roots-type compressors, one per bank, and two Memini carburetors upstream of the same. It had a displacement of 2981.7 cc, with the bore and stroke both being . It was an eight-cylinder in-line, having a compression ratio of 6.5: 1. The power delivered by the engine was between 415 and 430 hp at 6400-6800 rpm.

The brakes were drum brakes on the wheels with hydraulic control. The suspensions were with friction shock absorbers; the front ones were also equipped with torsion bars, while the rear ones were equipped with leaf springs. The steering was a worm screw and toothed sector, while the transmission consisted of a four-speed gearbox plus reverse.

The body design was open-wheel, covered in aluminum, while the chassis was made up of two side members with light-alloy cross members.

References

8CL
Grand Prix cars